The 1995 South American Cross Country Championships took place on February 25–26, 1995.  The races were held in Cali, Colombia.

Complete results, results for junior and youth competitions, and medal winners were published.

Medallists

Race results
The result lists might be incomplete.

Senior men's race (12 km)

Note: Athletes in parentheses did not score for the team result.

Junior (U20) men's race (8 km)

Note: Athletes in parentheses did not score for the team result.

Youth (U17) men's race (4 km)

Note: Athletes in parentheses did not score for the team result.

Senior women's race (6 km)

Note: Athletes in parentheses did not score for the team result.

Junior (U20) women's race (4 km)

Note: Athletes in parentheses did not score for the team result.

Youth (U17) women's race (4 km)

Note: Athletes in parentheses did not score for the team result.

Medal table (unofficial)

Note: Totals include both individual and team medals, with medals in the team competition counting as one medal.

Participation
According to an unofficial count, 60 athletes from 5 countries participated.

 (1)
 (18)
 (29)
 (11)
 Perú (1)

See also
 1995 in athletics (track and field)

References

External links
 GBRathletics

South American Cross Country Championships
South American Cross Country Championships
South American Cross Country Championships
1995 in South American sport
International athletics competitions hosted by Colombia
Cross country running in Colombia
February 1995 sports events in South America